Silent Nation is the ninth studio album by British rock band Asia, released in 2004. It was the last album with longtime vocalist and bassist John Payne, prior to the reunion of the original line-up in 2006.

Production
Silent Nation was recorded at Clear Lake Audio in North Hollywood, Los Angeles, and produced, engineered and mixed solely by Payne. The album features a stable line-up consisting of Payne, keyboard player Geoff Downes, guitarist Guthrie Govan and drummer Chris Slade, which had been achieved during Aura (2001) sessions. Early writing sessions were with guitarist and future member Billy Sherwood and drummer Jay Schellen. Eventually, two songs, "Ghost in the Mirror" and "I Will Be There for You", co-written by Sherwood, made the final album. "Darkness Day" and "The Prophet" were initially announced as "The Sun Don't Shine" and "Sail Away", respectively. An early track listing included "Long and Lonely Ride", but it was not finished in time. The main lyricist for Silent Nation was Payne. The lyrics are essentially based around the idea of the power centralization in the modern world, disfranchising the general public.

The album finally broke the tradition of naming Asia studio recordings with a word beginning and ending with the letter 'a'. The exception is Rare (1999), a collection of instrumental music, which was composed only by Payne and Downes, and, thus, may be viewed as their solo album. Silent Nation is also the first album to feature a photograph, not an illustration, as was Asia's trademark.

Release
Silent Nation was released on 31 August 2004 by Inside Out Music on CD and special edition CD/DVD-Video (featuring the making of the album). In Japan, it became available on 22 September 2004 through Victor and featured "Rise" as a bonus track.

Reception 
The reviews for Silent Nation were mixed to positive. Eleni Mouratoglou wrote a glowing review for Metal Temple in 2004: "Talent, maturity, inspiration. The judgment seemed hard in the beginning. But now there is only one thing left to say. The title does not start with an “A any more but I give them an A+. Long Live Asia!" Steve Pettengill gave the album 3 1/2 stars out of 5 on Sea of Tranquility, stating "I'm not exactly sure who or what constitutes an Asia audience these days, but for those who have been following the band through the years, they should be pleased with Silent Nation. It's much better than the schmaltzy Aura album of 2001. Though better cover art (where's Roger Dean?!) might help sales, Asia are not out of the game yet." Alfonso Algora of review site Progvisions also saw the album as decent, writing "Although you could think the album is not worthy after looking at the rating, I think old Asia fans could give this band a chance after the latest fiascos. Of course those who don´t like easy-to-listen progressive (¿?) sounds won´t be happy with this album. But if you like Asia, Saga and that kind of bands that blend mainstream (pop or AOR) with progressive sounds, and you thought that Asia was finished as a good band, you´ll have a good time listening to this album that it´s better, by far, than any other of Payne´s era." Sputnikmusic, however, was far less forgiving with a harsher take than most. "The music by this point was dying: Arena being the last album to actually have something good about it. It could be the saddest thing in the band's history since they decided to stop mainstream music."

Track listing

Personnel

Asia
 Geoff Downes – keyboards, percussion
 John Payne – vocals, guitar, bass; producer, engineer, mixing engineer
 Guthrie Govan – guitars
 Chris Slade – drums

Additional musicians
 Kim Nielsen Parsons – bass guitar (on "I Will Be There for You")
 Billy Sherwood – guitars, bass
 Ant Glynne – guitars
 Jay Schellen – drums

Technical personnel
 Eddy Schreyer – mastering engineer (at Oasis Mastering, Studio City, Los Angeles)
 Thomas Ewerhard – artwork, layout
 Robert John – photography
 Gene Kirkland – photography
 Ace Trump – live photography
 Billy White – digital art
 Roger Dean – Asia logotype

Charts

References

Asia (band) albums
2004 albums
Inside Out Music albums
Albums produced by John Payne (singer)